"Somebody Else's Fire" is a song written by Pat Bunch, Pam Rose and Mary Ann Kennedy, and recorded by American country music artist Janie Fricke.  It was released in September 1985 as the second single and title track from the album Somebody Else's Fire.  The song reached #4 on the Billboard Hot Country Singles & Tracks chart.

Chart performance

References

1985 singles
1985 songs
Janie Fricke songs
Songs written by Pam Rose
Songs written by Mary Ann Kennedy (American singer)
Song recordings produced by Bob Montgomery (songwriter)
Songs written by Pat Bunch
Columbia Records singles